Xu Chunmei (born 22 March 1966) is a Chinese basketball player. She competed in the women's tournament at the 1988 Summer Olympics. She had a brief career in South Korea's Women's Korean Basketball League in 2000 and 2001, when she was already in her mid-30s and a mother of one.

References

1966 births
Living people
Chinese women's basketball players
Olympic basketball players of China
Basketball players at the 1988 Summer Olympics
Sportspeople from Wuhan
Basketball players from Hubei
Chinese expatriate basketball people
Chinese expatriate sportspeople in South Korea
Expatriate basketball people in South Korea
Guangdong Vermilion Birds players
Asian Games medalists in basketball
Asian Games gold medalists for China
Asian Games silver medalists for China
Basketball players at the 1986 Asian Games
Basketball players at the 1990 Asian Games
Medalists at the 1986 Asian Games
Medalists at the 1990 Asian Games